The 2007 Purdue Boilermakers football represented Purdue University in the Big Ten Conference during the 2007 NCAA Division I FBS football season.  Joe Tiller, in his 11th season at Purdue, was the team's head coach.  The Boilermakers' home games were played at Ross–Ade Stadium in West Lafayette, Indiana.  Purdue began the 2007 season unranked in preseason polls.  Purdue played twelve regular season games during the 2007 season, including seven in West Lafayette.  They played in the Motor City Bowl where they defeated Central Michigan.

Schedule

Roster

Game summaries

Toledo

Eastern Illinois

Central Michigan

Minnesota

Source: ESPN

Notre Dame

    
    
    
    
    
    
    
    
    
    

PUR: Kory Sheets 27 Rush, 141 Yds

Ohio State

Michigan

Iowa

Northwestern

Penn State

Michigan State

Indiana

Motor City Bowl

Boilermaker kicker Chris Summers hit a 40-yard field goal as time expired to defeat the Central Michigan Chippewas 51–48. Purdue Quarterback Curtis Painter passed for a Motor City Bowl record 546 yards, going 35–54 with 3 touchdowns and 2 interceptions. Kory Sheets led the Boilermakers in rushing with 12 attempts for 27 yards and 2 touchdowns. Painter's favorite target was Greg Orton who caught 9 passes for 136 yards and 1 touchdown. For Central Michigan, QB Dan LeFevour went 17–34 with 292 yards and 4 touchdowns and no interceptions. He also led the Chippewas in rushing with 33 attempts for 114 yards and 2 touchdowns. LeFevour's favorite target was Bryan Anderson who caught 7 passes for 129 yards and 3 touchdowns. During the 1st half it was all Boilermakers, with Purdue leading 34–13 at the break. In the 2nd half the Chippewas started their comeback. It started with a 76-yard pass from LeFevour to Antonio Brown to make it 34–20. The Boilermakers then scored again on a 19-yard pass from Painter to Jake Standeford to make it 41–20. The Chippewas then proceeded to score three unanswered touchdowns, a 10-yard pass to Anderson, and the two rushing touchdowns by LeFevour to tie the game. With 8:19 left in the 4th quarter, Purdue retook the lead on a 13-yard run by Jaycen Taylor. With 1:09 left, LeFevour hit Anderson for 19 yards and a touchdown to tie it at 48. It would turn out that the Chippewas scored too quickly. Painter then led a drive full of short first down passes to the Chippewa 23, where Summers would kick his 40-yard walk-off field goal.

2008 NFL draft

References

Purdue
Purdue Boilermakers football seasons
Little Caesars Pizza Bowl champion seasons
Purdue Boilermakers football